Dichomeris melanophylla is a moth in the family Gelechiidae. It was described by Turner in 1919. It is found in Australia, where it has been recorded from Queensland.

The forewings are blackish-fuscous with obscure blackish dots. There is a median spot at one-fifth extending on both sides of the fold. There is a median dot at two-fifths, shortly preceded by a dot nearer the costa, and by another on the fold, and another median dot at three-fifths. The terminal edge is blackish. The hindwings are grey.

References

Moths described in 1919
melanophylla
Moths of Queensland